Grange Arch, also known as Creech Folly, is an 18th-century folly that is located near the second highest point of the Purbeck Hills, Ridgeway Hill (199 m), in Dorset. It lies within the parish of Steeple.

The folly, which was built by a former owner of Creech Grange, Denis Bond, in 1746, is built in the form of a triple arch of ashlar stone. The central archway is surmounted by battlements and flanked by stone walls with smaller doorway arches.

Today the arch is owned by the National Trust. English Heritage have designated it a Grade II* listed building.

See also 
Sham Castle

References 

Folly buildings in England
Grade II* listed buildings in Dorset
Arches and vaults in England